ANNA is a nu metal/hardcore band from Lviv, Ukraine.

ANNA has three times toured in Ukraine supporting both of its albums and the 10th anniversary of the band. Also ANNA has taken a part in many Ukrainian festivals (e.g. Rujnacija, Rock-Vybux, Taras Buljba, Metal Heads Mission, Big Alternative Gig, Fort.Missia).

The band ceased to exist in February 2013 because of conflict between Viktor Novosyolov and the rest of the band. Later Novosyolov created a project Kompas while some other ANNA members continue to collaborate as LATUR.

In 2015 the band got active taking part in the festival "Zavantazhennya" and preparing a big solo concert in Kyiv.

Members
 Viktor Novosyolov (Віктор Новосьолов) — vocal
 Serhiy Nesterenko (Сергій Нестеренко) — guitar, vocal
 Yuriy Pidtserkovnyi (Юрій Підцерковний) — guitar
 Mykhaylo Salo (Михайло Сало) — bass guitar
 Vadym Bayuk (Вадим Баюк) — drums

Former members
 Viktor Zhyrkov (Віктор Жирков) — programming, samples

Discography
 Проба (Proba, 2003; was not published)
 Сприймай мене (Spryjmaj mene, 2006; EP)
 Карматреш (Karmatrash, 2008)
 Карматреш (Karmatrash, 2008; single)
 Срібна Змія (Sribna Zmija, 2010)
 Гімн замурованих (Himn zamurovanyx, 2012; single)

Videography
 "Glamour" 
 "Karmatrash" 
 "Hra z Bohom" 
 "Čornyj Znak"

External links
 ANNA (myspace.com)

Nu metal musical groups
Ukrainian rock music groups
Musical groups established in 2002
2002 establishments in Ukraine
Musical groups from Lviv